The 2000 Southeastern Conference baseball tournament was held at Hoover Metropolitan Stadium in Hoover, Alabama from May 17 through 21. LSU defeated Florida in the championship game, earning the Southeastern Conference's automatic bid to the NCAA Tournament. LSU would go on to win the national championship at the College World Series in Omaha, NE, their fifth national championship in 10 seasons.

Regular-season results

Tournament 

 Vanderbilt, Ole Miss, Arkansas and Tennessee did not make the tournament.

All-Tournament Team

See also 
 College World Series
 NCAA Division I Baseball Championship
 Southeastern Conference baseball tournament

References 

 SECSports.com All-Time Baseball Tournament Results
 SECSports.com All-Tourney Team Lists

Tournament
Southeastern Conference Baseball Tournament
Southeastern Conference baseball tournament
Southeastern Conference baseball tournament
College sports tournaments in Alabama
Baseball competitions in Hoover, Alabama